The 2022 Sakhir FIA Formula 2 round was a motor racing event held between 18 and 20 March 2022 at the Bahrain International Circuit, Sakhir, Bahrain. It was the opening round of the 2022 FIA Formula 2 Championship and was held in support of the 2022 Bahrain Grand Prix.

Classification

Qualifying 
Qualifying took place on 18 March 2022, where Jack Doohan scored his first pole position in the series.

Sprint Race 

Notes:
  – Marino Sato had 5 seconds added to his race time for failing to respect track limits. He had one penalty point added to his license.
  – Clément Novalak and Jake Hughes both received 10 second time penalties for causing a collision. Both drivers had two penalty points added to their license.

Feature Race 

Notes:
 – Jehan Daruvala had 5 seconds added to his race time for failing to respect track limits. One penalty point was added to his license.
 – Enzo Fittipaldi had 5 seconds added to his race time for causing a collision with Richard Verschoor. One penalty point was added to his license.
 – Amaury Cordeel had 5 seconds and 10 seconds added to his race time, both for speeding in the pitlane. No penalty points were added to his license.
 – Olli Caldwell had 5 seconds added to his race time as the team failed to wait the correct period of time before carrying out the pit stop. No penalty points were added to his license for this offense.

Standings after the event 

Drivers' Championship standings

Teams' Championship standings

 Note: Only the top five positions are included for both sets of standings.

See also 

 2022 Bahrain Grand Prix
 2022 Sakhir Formula 3 round

References

External links 

 Official website

Sakhir
Sakhir Formula 2
Sakhir Formula 2